Tout Capable Elima (in English: Almighty Elima) is a football club from Matadi, DR Congo. TC Elima plays in the Linafoot.

Honours
Ligue de Football Bas-Congo (LIFBACO)
 Winners (4): 1995, 2009, 2010, 2012

External links
Club profile - Soccerway.com
TC Elima line-up

Football clubs in the Democratic Republic of the Congo
Sports clubs in the Democratic Republic of the Congo
Matadi